F55 or F-55 may refer to:
 F55 (classification), a disability sport classification for people who compete in field events from a seated position
 , an ocean liner requisitioned for the Royal Navy
 , a Leander-class frigate of the Royal New Zealand Navy
 Nikon F55, a 2002 35mm film SLR autofocus camera